The 2010 United States Senate election in Ohio was held on November 2, 2010 as one of many Ohio elections in 2010. Incumbent two-term Republican U.S. Senator George Voinovich decided to retire instead of seeking a third term. Former Representative Republican Rob Portman won the open seat.

Republican primary

Background 
With rumors circulating about Voinovich's possible retirement, former Director of the Office of Management and Budget, United States Trade Representative, and Congressman Rob Portman and State Auditor Mary Taylor were considered the main contenders for the Republican nomination. Former Ohio Secretary of State Ken Blackwell was also considered a potential candidate, but declined in order to run for chairman of the Republican National Committee.

Candidate 
 Rob Portman, former U.S. Representative, former United States Trade Representative and former Director of the Office of Management and Budget

Campaign 
When Voinovich made his retirement official, Portman declared his candidacy the next day. Thomas Ganley, a Cleveland car dealer, launched his campaign for the nomination in April, after Portman had collected support from most of the Ohio Republican establishment. Taylor officially declined to run in May and was announced as gubernatorial candidate John Kasich's running mate on January 12, 2010

Ganley was the only other declared candidate, but on February 17, 2010, he announced that he would switch races and run against Betty Sutton in Ohio's 13th congressional district instead, leaving Portman as the only Republican candidate. He had over $7 million in campaign funds.

Results

Democratic primary

Background 
Congressman Tim Ryan, Secretary of State Jennifer Brunner, and Lieutenant Governor Lee Fisher were considered leading contenders to run against George Voinovich. Ohio Governor Ted Strickland urged Jennifer Brunner to run for re-election rather than run for the Senate. Cuyahoga County Commissioner Peter Lawson Jones and Ohio State Representative Tyrone Yates considered running, but both withdrew from consideration.

Candidates 
 Lee Fisher, Lieutenant Governor
 Jennifer Brunner, Secretary of State

Campaign 
On February 17, 2009, Brunner and Fisher both officially announced their candidacies for the now-open seat election, with Strickland officially endorsing Fisher. Ryan declined to run and endorsed Fisher in July.

Fisher was endorsed by Governor Ted Strickland and U.S. Representatives John Boccieri, Tim Ryan, Zack Space, and Charlie Wilson.

Polling in late 2009 and January 2010 showed Brunner to be more competitive than Fisher in a general election matchup against Portman, while Fisher and Brunner were deadlocked in Democratic primary polling.

Charlene Renee Bradley and Traci Johnson also filed to run in the Democratic primary.

Polling

Results

General election

Candidates 
 Rob Portman (R), former U.S. Congressman and Cabinet member for George W. Bush
 Lee Fisher (D), Lieutenant Governor, former Ohio Attorney General, former State Senator, and former State Representative
 Dan La Botz (Socialist Party)
 Eric Deaton (Constitution Party)
 Michael Pryce (Independent)

Campaign 
When the incumbent announced he would retire, Portman jumped into the race in early 2009. During the two-year time period, Portman raised over $9 million. Originally, the election was seen as a toss-up, as Portman's experience in the Bush administration was considered a liability for him. Both President Barack Obama and Vice President Joe Biden campaigned for Fisher. However, Portman consistently led in fundraising and polling, particularly as Portman was unopposed in the Republican primary, while the Democratic primary between Fisher and Brunner was highly divisive.

Television advertisements were very negative. Fisher attacked Portman for helping to ship jobs overseas during his entire political career, backing deals that shipped jobs overseas, and the trade deficit with China, which grew by over $41 billion. Portman claimed in response that most jobs were being lost to other states, not countries. Portman attacked Fisher for supporting Obama's stimulus and cap and trade.

Debates 
Three debates were held in  Cleveland, Columbus, and Toledo. The first one was in Toledo on October 5. The second one was in Cleveland on October 8, while the third was in Columbus on October 12.

Predictions

Polling

Fundraising

Results 
Winning the election, Portman received 57% of the votes. He received the majority of votes in 82 of 88 counties and in 15 of 18 Congressional districts, including the district of liberal U.S. Congressman Dennis Kucinich.

See also 
 Ohio elections, 2010
 United States House of Representatives elections in Ohio, 2010

References

External links 
 Ohio Secretary of State - Elections 
 U.S. Congress candidates for Ohio at Project Vote Smart
 Ohio U.S. Senate 2010 from OurCampaigns.com
 Campaign contributions from Open Secrets
 2010 Ohio Senate General Election: Rob Portman (R) vs Lee Fisher (D) graph of multiple polls from Pollster.com
 Election 2010: Ohio Senate from Rasmussen Reports
 2010 Ohio Senate Race from Real Clear Politics
 2010 Ohio Senate Race from CQ Politics
 Race profile from The New York Times
Official campaign websites (Archived)
 Jennifer Brunner
 Eric Deaton
 Lee Fisher
 Rob Portman
 Dan La Botz

2010
Ohio
Senate